Gazestan (also Romanized as Gazestān; also known as Gāzīstān, Ghāzistān, Jarestān, and Jazestān) is a village in Kushk Rural District, in the Central District of Bafq County, Yazd Province, Iran. At the 2006 census, its population was 69, in 26 families.

References 

Populated places in Bafq County